El Toro in Catalan, sometimes known by its Spanish name of Monte Toro, is the tallest hill of the island of Menorca, rising to an elevation of  above mean sea level. The mountain is home to the Sanctuary of the Verge del Toro. The mountain's summit can be reached by automobile or on foot, from which there is a fantastic view of the nearby areas of the island.

El Toro is designated as an ANEI (protected natural area).

Etymology 
The name "Toro" is an evolution, in part for the different languages and cultures that have passed in the island, of the Catalan (Menorquí) word "Turó", which means Hill. The name could also be derived from Arabic, coming from tor or al-tor which means 'height'.

Location 
Monte Toro rises above the surrounding farmland and foothills approximately 2 miles (3km) east from the central town of Es Mercadal, in the centre of the island. It can be seen from places throughout the island and is instantly recognisable, due to the fact it is Menorca's only prominent summit.

Features 
On a clear day, you can see the whole of the island, especially the northern region from Ciutadella to Fornells and even the mountains of Mallorca.

Monuments of interest 

At its summit is the Sanctuary of the Virgen del Toro, an old Gothic church from 1670. There is also a statue of Christ, a gift shop, Match Digital's Spanish office and a restaurant with excellent views.

External links
 Vista panorámica de 360° desde Monte Toro

Landforms of Menorca
Landforms of the Balearic Islands
Hills of Spain
Tourist attractions in the Balearic Islands